The Hemker Park & Zoo is a family owned zoo founded in 1977 in Freeport, Minnesota, United States. The zoo was founded by Mark and Joan Hemker.

History
The Hemker Park and Zoo was started in 1977 by Mark and Joan Hemker in Freeport, Minnesota, when the couple acquired their first collection of waterfowl. It started out as the Hemker Game Farm. In 1980, the farm acquired its first pair of white-tail deer and a black bear. The zoo expanded in 1985 when it acquired a pronghorn antelope and a pair of reindeer. In 1992, the Hemker Game Farm became the Hemker Wildlife Park and later that same year added six black-footed penguins to their collection. Finally in 1994, the Hemker Wildlife Park opened to the public for the first time. The turn of the century brought new exhibits to the Hemker Wildlife Park such as the African Safari. In 2006, beloved owner Mark Hemker died, but his family made the decision to keep the zoo open in his memory. In 2008, Hemker Wildlife Park became the Hemker Park & Zoo and added a new picnic area and farm petting zoo. In 2010, the penguins returned and in 2012 the zoo added two New Guinea singing dogs - Gus and Lucy.

Animals
Mammals

Reptiles

Birds

Other

Experiences
Other experiences offered by the zoo include educational tours, reindeer sleigh rides, picnics, birthday parties, wagon rides, and a mobile petting zoo. Also offered by the zoo is the Zoo Keeper Experience Day. For this you get to spend a day with one of the zoo keepers and help with feeding, enrichment programs, educational programs, and cleaning.

Future

The zoo planned on adding a rhinoceros in 2018.

See also
 Minnesota Zoo
 Como Zoo and Conservatory
 Zollman Zoo
 Como Zoo, Saint Paul, Minnesota

Notes

External links
 

Tourist attractions in Stearns County, Minnesota
Zoos in Minnesota